Soh Wooi Yik  (born 17 February 1998) is a Malaysian badminton player. He was part of the Malaysian 2015 and 2016 BWF World Junior Championships team, and has helped Malaysia clinch a silver medal in mixed team after being defeated by China in 2016. Soh and his partner Aaron Chia were the All England Open finalists and the Southeast Asian Games gold medalists in 2019. The duo won the bronze medal in the men's doubles at the 2020 Summer Olympics, and won the men's doubles title at the 2022 World Championships.

Background 
Soh was born in Kuala Lumpur. He is the son of former Malaysian badminton player Soh Goon Chup. His maternal uncle Soo Beng Kiang is a former Malaysia badminton player and Olympian and had partnered with Cheah Soon Kit to help Malaysia win the 1992 Thomas Cup.

Career 
He began playing badminton when he was 4. He was selected to play for Kuala Lumpur when he was 7. Later he received an offer to study at  Bukit Jalil Sports School when he was 13. In 2015, he partnered Ooi Zi Heng and won gold in the 2015 ASEAN School Games.

In November 2015, Soh partnered Aaron Chia but crashed out in the fourth round of the boys' doubles event in the 2016 World Junior Championships. Based on their improved  performance, he was drafted to the national back-up squad at the end of 2015 where he was coached by Cheah Soon Kit.

In July 2016, Soh and Ooi won the boys' doubles bronze medal at the 2016 Asian Junior Championships. They were defeated by the Chinese pair of Han Chengkai and Zhou Haodong in straight games (15–21, 17–21). Soh suffered injuries and was not able to improve his performance in the 2016 World Junior Championships. Despite that, he was still drafted into the national team after the event.

Soh played for Petaling BC at the beginning of 2017. He partnered Chen Tang Jie and reached two finals in International Challenge/Series events. In October 2017, Soh was recruited into the national team.

Before the end of the 2017 season, Soh reunited with Aaron Chia and managed to qualify for the finals of the India International Challenge.

In March 2018, the duo stormed into their second international finals in Vietnam International Challenge, but still, they failed to win their elusive first career title.

2021: Olympic bronze 
In late July, Soh partnered up with Aaron Chia at the men's doubles event at the Summer Olympics. The duo won the bronze medal by defeating Mohammad Ahsan and Hendra Setiawan 17–21, 21–17, 21–14 in the bronze medal playoff, winning bronze for Malaysia.

2022: First world title for Malaysia 
In late August, Soh partnered Aaron Chia as the 6th seeds at the 2022 World Championships. In the final, they defeated 3-time world champions Mohammad Ahsan and Hendra Setiawan 21–19, 21–14 to clinch Malaysia's first-ever gold medal in the tournament.

Achievements

Olympic Games 
Men's doubles

BWF World Championships 
Men's doubles

Asian Championships 
Men's doubles

Commonwealth Games 
Men's doubles

Southeast Asian Games 
Men's doubles

Asian Junior Championships 
Boys' doubles

BWF World Tour (4 runners-up) 
The BWF World Tour, which was announced on 19 March 2017 and implemented in 2018, is a series of elite badminton tournaments sanctioned by the Badminton World Federation (BWF). The BWF World Tour is divided into levels of World Tour Finals, Super 1000, Super 750, Super 500, Super 300, and the BWF Tour Super 100.

Men's doubles

BWF International Challenge/Series (5 runners-up) 
Men's doubles

  BWF International Challenge tournament
  BWF International Series tournament
  BWF Future Series tournament

Record against selected opponents 
Record against year-end Finals finalists, World Championships semi finalists, and Olympic quarter finalists. Accurate as of 7 September 2022.

Aaron Chia 
Soh Wooi Yik and Aaron Chia have six winning streaks in the head-to-head record against Satwiksairaj Rankireddy and Chirag Shetty. Meanwhile, Chia and Soh have a poor head-to-head record against Mohammad Ahsan and Hendra Setiawan (4–7), Marcus Fernaldi Gideon and Kevin Sanjaya Sukamuljo (2–6), and also Takuro Hoki and Yugo Kobayashi (2–5).

Awards

Honours 
  :
 Officer of the Order of the Territorial Crown (K.M.W) (2022)

References

External links 
 

Living people
1998 births
Sportspeople from Kuala Lumpur
Malaysian sportspeople of Chinese descent
Malaysian male badminton players
Badminton players at the 2020 Summer Olympics
Olympic badminton players of Malaysia
Olympic bronze medalists for Malaysia
Olympic medalists in badminton
Medalists at the 2020 Summer Olympics
Badminton players at the 2022 Commonwealth Games
Commonwealth Games gold medallists for Malaysia
Commonwealth Games bronze medallists for Malaysia
Commonwealth Games medallists in badminton
Competitors at the 2019 Southeast Asian Games
Southeast Asian Games gold medalists for Malaysia
Southeast Asian Games silver medalists for Malaysia
Southeast Asian Games medalists in badminton
21st-century Malaysian people
Medallists at the 2022 Commonwealth Games